Stephen McIvor (born 5 February 1969 in Dublin) is a retired Irish rugby union player. He played at scrum-half, primarily for Garryowen and Munster, and also won three caps for Ireland from 1996 to 1997.

References

External links
"SPOONS STIR IT UP IN DUBAI"

Munster Rugby players
Garryowen Football Club players
Irish rugby union players
Ireland international rugby union players
Connacht Rugby players
Buccaneers RFC players
Living people
1969 births
Rugby union players from Dublin (city)
Rugby union scrum-halves